The following lists the number one rock singles in Canada in 2004 based on airplay from Mediabase which was published in Radio & Records magazine. The chart was launched on April 16, 2004.

Chart history

References

Canada Rock Singles